The non-marine molluscs of Lithuania are a part of the molluscan fauna of Lithuania.

Freshwater gastropods
This list is based on Ewa Włosik-Bieńczak's "Molluscs of selected watercourses and reservoirs in Vilnius".

Neritidae
 Theodoxus fluviatilis (Linnaeus, 1758)

Viviparidae
 Viviparus contectus (Millet, 1813)
 Viviparus viviparus (Linnaeus, 1758)

Bithyniidae
 Bithynia tentaculata (Linnaeus, 1758)
 Bithynia leachii (Sheppard, 1823)

Hydrobiidae
 Potamopyrgus antipodarum (Gray, 1843)

Amnicolidae
 Marstoniopsis scholtzi (A. Schmidt, 1856)

Lithoglyphidae
 Lithoglyphus naticoides (C. Pfeiffer, 1828)

Valvatidae
 Valvata cristata O. F. Müller, 1774
 Valvata pulchella Studer, 1820
 Valvata piscinalis (O. F. Müller, 1774)
 Valvata naticina Menke, 1845

Acroloxidae
 Acroloxus lacustris (Linnaeus, 1758)

Lymnaeidae
 Lymnaea stagnalis (Linnaeus, 1758)
 Stagnicola palustris (O. F. Müller, 1774)
 Stagnicola corvus (Gmelin, 1791)
 Galba truncatula (O. F. Müller, 1774)
 Omphiscola glabra (O. F. Müller, 1774)
 Radix auricularia (Linnaeus, 1758)
 Radix peregra (O. F. Müller, 1774)
 Myxas glutinosa (O. F. Müller, 1774)

Physidae
 Physa fontinalis (Linnaeus, 1758)
 Physella acuta (Draparnaud, 1805)
 Aplexa hypnorum (Linnaeus, 1758)

Planorbidae
 Planorbarius corneus (Linnaeus, 1758)
 Planorbis planorbis (Linnaeus, 1758)
 Planorbis carinatus O. F. Müller, 1774
 Anisus spirorbis (Linnaeus, 1758)
 Anisus leucostoma (Millet, 1813)
 Anisus septemgyratus (Rossmässler, 1835)
 Anisus vortex (Linnaeus, 1758)
 Anisus vorticulus (Troschel, 1834)
 Bathyomphalus contortus (Linnaeus, 1758)
 Gyraulus albus (O. F. Müller, 1774)
 Gyraulus laevis (Alder, 1838)
 Gyraulus riparius (Westerlund, 1865)
 Gyraulus rossmaessleri (Auerswald, 1852)
 Gyraulus gredleri (Gredler, 1859)
 Armiger crista (Linnaeus, 1758)
 Hippeutis complanatus (Linnaeus, 1758)
 Segmentina nitida (O. F. Müller, 1774)
 Ancylus fluviatilis O. F. Müller, 1774

Land gastropods
This list is based on Grita Skujiene's "An overview of the data on the terrestrial molluscs in Lithuania".

Aciculidae
 Acicula polita (Hartmann, 1840)

Carychiidae
 Carychium minimum O. F. Müller, 1774
 Carychium tridentatum (Risso, 1826)

Succineidae
 Succinea oblonga Draparnaud, 1801
 Succinea putris (Linnaeus, 1758)
 Oxyloma elegans (Risso, 1826)
 Oxyloma sarsii (Esmark, 1886)

Cochlicopidae
 Cochlicopa lubrica (O. F. Müller, 1774)
 Cochlicopa nitens (Gallenstein, 1848)

Truncatellinidae
 Columella edentula (Draparnaud, 1805)
 Truncatellina cylindrica (Férussac, 1807)

Vertiginidae
 Vertigo pusilla (O. F. Müller, 1774)
 Vertigo antivertigo (Draparnaud, 1801)
 Vertigo substriata (Jeffreys, 1833)
 Vertigo pygmaea (Draparnaud, 1801)
 Vertigo moulinsiana (Dupuy, 1849)
 Vertigo modesta (Say, 1824)
 Vertigo ronnebyensis (Westerlund, 1871)
 Vertigo genesii (Gredler, 1856)
 Vertigo geyeri Lindholm, 1925
 Vertigo alpestris Alder, 1837
 Vertigo angustior Jeffreys, 1830

Pupillidae
 Pupilla muscorum (Linnaeus, 1758)

Valloniidae
 Vallonia costata (O. F. Müller, 1774)
 Vallonia pulchella (O. F. Müller, 1774)
 Vallonia excentrica Sterki, 1892
 Acanthinula aculeata (O. F. Müller, 1774)

Enidae
 Ena montana (Draparnaud, 1801)
 Ena obscura (O. F. Müller, 1774)

Punctidae
 Punctum pygmaeum (Draparnaud, 1801)

Discidae
 Discus ruderatus (Férussac, 1821)
 Discus rotundatus (O. F. Müller, 1774)

Arionidae
 Arion rufus (Linnaeus, 1758)
 Arion subfuscus (Draparnaud, 1805)
 Arion hortensis Férussac, 1819
 Arion circumscriptus (Johnston, 1828)
 Arion silvaticus Lohmander, 1937
 Arion fasciatus (Nilsson, 1822)

Vitrinidae
 Vitrina pellucida (O. F. Müller, 1774)

Pristilomatidae
 Vitrea crystallina (O. F. Müller, 1774)
 Vitrea contracta (Westerlund, 1871)

Oxychilidae
 Aegopinella pura (Alder, 1830)
 Aegopinella nitens (Michaud, 1831)
 Aegopinella nitidula (Draparnaud, 1805)
 Nesovitrea hammonis (Ström, 1765)
 Nesovitrea petronella (L. Pfeiffer, 1853)
 Oxychilus cellarius (O. F. Müller, 1774)

Gastrodontidae
 Zonitoides nitidus (O. F. Müller, 1774)

Limacidae
 Limax maximus Linnaeus, 1758
 Limax cinereoniger Wolf, 1803
 Limacus flavus Linnaeus, 1758
 Malacolimax tenellus (O. F. Müller, 1774)
 Lehmannia marginata (O. F. Müller, 1774)
 Ambigolimax valentianus (Férussac, 1821)

Agriolimacidae
 Deroceras sturanyi (Simroth, 1894)
 Deroceras laeve (O. F. Müller, 1774)
 Deroceras agreste (Linnaeus, 1758)
 Deroceras reticulatum (O. F. Müller, 1774)

Euconulidae
 Euconulus fulvus (O. F. Müller, 1774)

Clausiliidae
 Cochlodina laminata (Montagu, 1803)
 Cochlodina orthostoma (Menke, 1830)
 Ruthenica filograna (Rossmässler, 1836)
 Macrogastra ventricosa (Draparnaud, 1801)
 Macrogastra plicatula (Draparnaud, 1801)
 Macrogastra latestriata (A. Schmidt, 1857)
 Clausilia bidentata (Ström, 1765)
 Clausilia dubia (Draparnaud, 1805)
 Clausilia cruciata (Studer, 1802)
 Clausilia pumila C. Pfeiffer, 1828
 Laciniaria plicata (Draparnaud, 1801)
 Balea biplicata (Montagu, 1803)
 Bulgarica cana (Held, 1836)

Camaenidae
 Bradybaena fruticum (O. F. Müller, 1774)

Geomitridae
 Helicella obvia (Menke, 1828)

Hygromiidae
 Perforatella bidentata (Gmelin, 1791)
 Perforatella rubiginosa (A. Schmidt, 1853)
 Trichia hispida (Linnaeus, 1758)
 Euomphalia strigella (Draparnaud, 1801)

Helicidae
 Arianta arbustorum (Linnaeus, 1758)
 Chilostoma faustinum (Rossmässler, 1835)
 Isognomostoma isognomostomos (Schröter, 1784)
 Cepaea nemoralis (Linnaeus, 1758)
 Cepaea hortensis (O. F. Müller, 1774)
 Helix pomatia Linnaeus, 1758

Freshwater bivalves
This list is based on Ewa Włosik-Bieńczak's "Molluscs of selected watercourses and reservoirs in Vilnius".

Margaritiferidae
 Margaritifera margaritifera (Linnaeus, 1758)

Unionidae
 Unio pictorum (Linnaeus, 1758)
 Unio tumidus Philipsson, 1788
 Unio crassus Philipsson, 1788
 Anodonta cygnea (Linnaeus, 1758)
 Anodonta anatina (Linnaeus, 1758)
 Pseudanodonta complanata (Rossmässler, 1835)

Sphaeriidae
 Sphaerium corneum (Linnaeus, 1758)
 Sphaerium rivicola (Lamarck, 1818)
 Sphaerium solidum (Normand, 1844)
 Musculium lacustre (O. F. Müller, 1774)
 Pisidium amnicum (O. F. Müller, 1774)
 Pisidium henslowanum (Sheppard, 1823)
 Pisidium supinum A. Schmidt, 1851
 Pisidium lilljeborgii (Clessin, 1886)
 Pisidium milium Held, 1836
 Pisidium pseudosphaerium Favre, 1927
 Pisidium subtruncatum Malm, 1855
 Pisidium pulchellum (Jenyns, 1832)
 Pisidium nitidum Jenyns, 1832
 Pisidium hibernicum Westerlund, 1894
 Pisidium obtusale (Lamarck, 1818)
 Pisidium personatum Malm, 1855
 Pisidium casertanum (Poli, 1791)
 Pisidium conventus (Clessin, 1877)
 Pisidium moitessierianum Paladilhe, 1866
 Pisidium tenuilineatum Stelfox, 1918

Dreissenidae
 Dreissena polymorpha (Pallas, 1771)

See also

 List of non-marine molluscs of Latvia
 List of non-marine molluscs of Poland
 List of non-marine molluscs of Russia

References

Molluscs
Lithuania